Fleetwood Farm, also known as Peggy's Green, is a Federal style house in Loudoun County, Virginia. The house is conjectured to have been built around 1775 by William Ellzey, a lawyer originally from Virginia's Tidewater region. The house is an unusual example of post-and-beam construction in a region where stone or brick construction is more usual.

The house is a 2-1/2 story post-and-beam framed structure on a stone foundation and basement. The frame is infilled with brick nogging and covered with weatherboarding.  The weatherboards are covered with stucco. The main block is three bays with a small entry porch supported by Tuscan columns. A one-story frame addition extends to the west. The interior was originally arranged on a side-passage plan, which has since been altered. The house features extensive wainscoting. The main parlor features full-height paneling. A second wing was added in 1984. The stucco is believed to have been installed in the 1930s or 1940s. A dining room is also accessed from the side hall. The second floor of the main house has two bedrooms.

The property includes three contributing outbuildings: a smokehouse, springhouse and barn. The house and outbuildings were listed on the National Register of Historic Places on February 1, 1991.

References

Farms on the National Register of Historic Places in Virginia
National Register of Historic Places in Loudoun County, Virginia
Federal architecture in Virginia
Houses in Loudoun County, Virginia